The 2022 Utah House of Representatives election took place on November 8, 2022, as part of the biennial 2022 United States elections. Elections were held in 75 electoral districts to elect two-year term members to the Utah House of Representatives.

Predictions

Results

Overview

Close races 
Districts where the margin of victory was under 10%:

District 1

References

See also 

Utah House
Utah House of Representatives elections
2022 Utah elections